Rubén Oscar Glaría (born 10 March 1948 in Argentina) is a former Argentine football player and manager, and a current politician. He played for San Lorenzo and Racing Club and represented the Argentina national football team at the 1974 World Cup.

Glaria made his professional debut for San Lorenzo in 1968, during his time with the club he participated in four championship winning campaigns.

In 1974, Glaria was part of the Argentina squad for the World Cup and in 1975 he joined Racing Club.

After his retirement as a player Glaria became a football manager, he worked at a number of clubs in Argentina, including San Miguel, Sportivo Italiano, Chaco For Ever, Villa Dálmine and Atlanta.

Glaria became particularly involved in politics in the 1980s, serving on the campaign to elect Carlos Menem as President of Argentina. He was provincial sports minister for Buenos Aires Province From 1995 he served as the Justicialist Party mayor of José Clemente Paz, until 1999 when he was displaced by a rival group of Justicialists. Glaria lost the internal selection of the PJ and launched his own faction, the Peronist Front. The subsequent election spilled over into a notable violent episode between the factions, which saw gunshots and stabbings, with eight wounded. In 2005, he was a candidate for national senator for the Buenos Aires New Party.

Honours
San Lorenzo
 Argentine Primera División: 1968 Metropolitano, 1972 Metropolitano, 1972 Nacional, 1974 Nacional

References

External links
 CV Rubén Oscar Glaria 

Argentine footballers
Association football defenders
Argentina international footballers
Argentine Primera División players
San Lorenzo de Almagro footballers
Racing Club de Avellaneda footballers
Argentine football managers
1974 FIFA World Cup players
Justicialist Party politicians
Mayors of José C. Paz, Buenos Aires
1948 births
Living people
Place of birth missing (living people)